Sodna Vas is a small settlement in the Municipality of Podčetrtek in eastern Slovenia. The area is part of the traditional region of Styria. It is now included in the Savinja Statistical Region.

References

External links
Sodna Vas on Geopedia

Populated places in the Municipality of Podčetrtek